"Friends" is a song by American pop project Francis and the Lights featuring Bon Iver and uncredited contributions from Kanye West. The song was released as a single on July 7, 2016, accompanied by a music video featuring Francis Farewell Starlite, Justin Vernon of Bon Iver and Kanye West.

The song was sampled in Chance the Rapper's song "Summer Friends" from his 2016 mixtape Coloring Book. "Friends" was sampled in "Summer Friends" before it was officially released independently as a single by Francis and the Lights.

Red Bull named it as the 15th best song of 2016.

Francis and the Lights, Vernon and West collaborated again in 2019 on the song "Take Me to the Light."

Music video
A music video for "Friends" was released on July 7, 2016. The video was directed by Jake Schreier. Knowing each other since childhood, Francis and Schreier have been making single-take, minimalist performance videos since 2008. They wanted to do the next iteration of what they had been doing before. In a 2016 interview, Schreier said, "We had never done a synchronized dance in a video or really had other protagonists in the video, so that's what we wanted to add to this one."

Pitchfork named it as the 18th best music video of 2016. NPR named it as one of the best music videos of 2016.

Track listing

Charts

References

External links
 

2016 singles
2016 songs
Francis and the Lights songs
Bon Iver songs
Songs written by Justin Vernon
Songs written by Rostam Batmanglij
Song recordings produced by Ariel Rechtshaid
Songs written by Benny Blanco
Song recordings produced by Benny Blanco
Songs written by Cashmere Cat
Song recordings produced by Cashmere Cat
Song recordings produced by Rostam Batmanglij
Music videos directed by Jake Schreier
Songs written by BJ Burton